On the Rocks is an American television sitcom that aired on ABC from September 11, 1975 to May 17, 1976. Originally telecast after Barney Miller, ABC promoted the two shows with the tagline "Funny cops, and funny robbers". It is based on the British series Porridge.

Premise
The series centered on the inmates of Alomesa Minimum Security prison. The main setting was usually the cell block containing Hector Fuentes, Lester DeMott, and Nicky Palik.

Cast
Rick Hurst as Cleaver
Jose Perez as Hector Fuentes
Bobby Sandler as Nicky Palik
Hal Williams as Lester DeMott
Tom Poston as Mr. Sullivan
Mel Stewart as Mr. Gibson

Episodes

References

External links

1970s American sitcoms
American Broadcasting Company original programming
1975 American television series debuts
1976 American television series endings
American television series based on British television series
American prison television series
Television shows set in California